Duane Delton Crandall (born August 14, 1946) was a Canadian politician. He served in the Legislative Assembly of British Columbia from 1986 to 1991, as a Social Credit member for the constituency of Columbia River.

On October 3, 1989, Crandall and three colleagues — Graham Bruce, David Mercier, and Doug Mowat — quit the governing Social Credit caucus to sit as "Independent Social Credit" members. In a joint statement, the four stressed that they "in no way desire[d] the fall of our government", but wished to spur an "open and realistic assessment" of Bill Vander Zalm's continued leadership. Crandall rejoined the Socred caucus on January 24, 1990, in order to better deal with a wave of layoffs in his riding. His decision caused the other three rebels to reflect on their future, and on February 14, they also rejoined the Socred caucus.

References

British Columbia Social Credit Party MLAs
1946 births
Living people